The Forest Rangers may refer to:

The Forest Rangers (TV series), Canadian TV series
The Forest Rangers (band), band formed to create the soundtrack for TV series Sons of Anarchy
The Forest Rangers (film), 1942 film starring Fred MacMurray, Paulette Goddard, and Susan Hayward
Forest Rangers F.C., a Zambian footbal club

See also
Park ranger, sometimes called a forest ranger